The 17th Jutra Awards were held on March 15, 2015 to honour films made with the participation of the Quebec film industry in 2014. Xavier Dolan's film Mommy was the night's big winner, taking eight awards overall. Due to the eligibility period for the awards, Dolan's 2013 film Tom at the Farm (Tom à la ferme) was also a nominee in several categories, although the only award it won was one in which Mommy was not also a nominee.

They were the last awards to be presented under the Jutra name; in early 2016, Quebec Cinema renamed the awards after the publication of a biography of Claude Jutra, the award's former namesake, which contained allegations that he had sexually abused underage children during his lifetime.

Winners and nominees

References

2015 in Quebec
Jutra
17
2014 in Canadian cinema